The following is a list of notable deaths in November 1991.

Entries for each day are listed alphabetically by surname. A typical entry lists information in the following sequence:
 Name, age, country of citizenship at birth, subsequent country of citizenship (if applicable), reason for notability, cause of death (if known), and reference.

November 1991

1
Mary Ainslee, 77, American film actress.
Fernand Brunner, 71, Swiss philosopher.
Moisés Carmona, 79, Mexican Roman Catholic bishop.
Richard Hoppin, 78, American musicologist.
Arun Paudwal, 1990, Indian Bollywood film score composer.

2
Irwin Allen, 75, American film producer (The Poseidon Adventure, The Towering Inferno), heart attack.
Yosef Almogi, 81, Israeli politician.
Jimmy Hull, 74, American basketball player, heart attack.
Hannes Messemer, 67, German actor, heart attack.
Francisco Moreira, 76, Portuguese football player.
Mort Shuman, 52, American songwriter and pianist, cancer.
Richard C. Thomas, 54, American politician, throat cancer.

3
Finn Alnæs, 59, Norwegian novelist.
Birendra Krishna Bhadra, 86, Indian radio broadcaster, playwright, actor, and narrator.
Raymond Blackburn, 76, British politician.
Ray Collins, 64, American gridiron football player.
P. Narendranath, 57, Indian author.
John Sandwith Boys Smith, 90, British academic.
Marinus Valentijn, 91, Dutch road bicycle racer.
Roman Wilhelmi, 55, Polish theatre and film actor, liver cancer.

4
Mohideen Baig, 71, Sri Lankan musician.
Roger E. Broggie, 83, American mechanical engineer.
Cliff Keen, 90, American wrestling coach.
Hermann Kutschera, 88, Austrian architect.
Arthur Nord, 93, Norwegian wrestler and Olympian.

5
Bill Atkins, 56, American gridiron football player.
Maurice V. Brady, 87, American politician.
Oreste Corbatta, 55, Argentine football player.
Bill Cronin, 47, American gridiron football player.
Kenneth Archibald Harrison, 90, Canadian mycologist.
Fred MacMurray, 83, American actor (Double Indemnity, My Three Sons, The Shaggy Dog), pneumonia.
Robert Maxwell, 68, Czechoslovak-British media tycoon, politician and fraudster, heart attack combined with accidental drowning.

6
Harriet Bland, 76, American sprinter and Olympic chasmpion.
Oskar Thierbach, 82, German road bicycle racer.
Gene Tierney, 70, American actress (Leave Her to Heaven, Laura), emphysema.
André Vandernoot, 64, Belgian conductor.
Giannis Vazos, 77, Greek football player.

7
Valery Aleksyev, 62, Soviet and Russian anthropologist.
Franc Červan, 55, Yugoslav long-distance runner and Olympian.
Tom of Finland, 71, Finnish artist, emphysema.
Ralph Harvey, 90, American politician.
Ed Marlo, 78, American magician.
Gaston Monnerville, 94, French politician and lawyer, cancer.
Ishak Haji Muhammad, 81, Malaysian writer.
Guillermo "Willy" Oddó, 48, Chilean musician, murdered.

8
Hardy Brown, 67, American football player, dementia.
Frances Faye, 79, American singer.
John Kirkpatrick, 86, American pianist and musical scholar.
Charlotte Moorman, 57, American cellist, performance artist, and avant-gardist, breast cancer.
Dave Rowbotham, 33, English rock musician, murdered.
Billy Savidan, 89, New Zealand long distance runner and Olympian.

9
Jana Dítětová, 65, Czechoslovak film actress.
Lance Hayward, 75, Bermudan-American jazz pianist, pneumonia.
Yves Montand, 70, Italian-French actor and singer, heart attack.
John Newton, 71, New Zealand rugby player.
Ralph Moses Paiewonsky, 84, United States Virgin Islands politician.
Laurie Wilkinson, 87, Australian politician.

10
Dick the Bruiser, 62, American professional wrestler and football player, internal bleeding.
Gunnar Gren, 71, Swedish football player.
Colin Johnstone, 70, New Zealand rower.
Tutte Lemkow, 73, Norwegian actor (Raiders of the Lost Ark, Fiddler on the Roof, Doctor Who), leukemia.
Alessandro Lessona, 100, Italian politician.
Robert Baird McClure, 90, Canadian physician and medical missionary to Asia.
Florian Radu, 71, Romanian football player.
Montserrat Roig, 45, Spanish writer, breast cancer.
Vishnuprasad Trivedi, 92, Indian literary critic.
Curt Weibull, 105, Swedish historian, educator and author.

11
John Balfanz, 51, American ski jumper and Olympian.
Heinz Becker, 76, German-American baseball player.
Billy Behan, 80, Irish football player and manager.
Nellie Halstead, 81, English track and field athlete and Olympic medalist.
Nadezhda Shteinmiller, 76, Soviet artist.
Tom Skinner, 82, New Zealand politician and Trades Union leader.
Morton Stevens, 62, American film and television composer (Hawaii Five-O), Emmy winner (1970, 1974), cancer.

12
Diane Brewster, 60, American actress, heart failure (Leave It to Beaver, Maverick, The Fugitive), heart failure.
Ravishing Ripper Collins, 58, American professional wrestler, melanoma.
Bobby Joe Edmonds, 50, American basketball player.
Keizō Hayashi, 84, Japanese civil servant and general officer.
Bruce Hubbard, 39, American operatic baritone, pneumonia.
Gabriele Tinti, 59, Italian actor, heart attack.

13
Hanson W. Baldwin, 88, American journalist.
Henryk Borowski, 81, Polish theater, radio and film actor.
Paul-Émile Léger, 87, Canadian Roman Catholic cardinal, pneumonia.
Walter Ulbrich, 81, German film producer.
Georges Winckelmans, 81, French football player and coach.

14
Constantin Chiriță, 66, Romanian writer.
William Nyrén, 71, Norwegian actor.
Tony Richardson, 63, English film director (Tom Jones, Look Back in Anger, A Taste of Honey), Oscar winner (1964), AIDS.
Bryden Thomson, 63, Scottish conductor, cancer.
Yoshikata Yoda, 82, Japanese screenwriter.

15
Doris Marie Bender, 79, American social worker.
Patricia Black, 18, Northern Irish volunteer in the IRA, bombing accident.
Sylvio Hoffmann, 83, Brazilian football player.
V. S. Huzurbazar, 72, Indian statistician from Kolhapur.
Robert McCall, 33, Canadian ice dancer, brain cancer.
Jacques Morali, 44, French music producer (Village People), AIDS.
George Simms, 81, Archbishop in the Church of Ireland.

16
Bill Dodd, 81, American lawyer and politician.
Maya Dolas, 25, Indian mobster, ballistic trauma.
Alberto Girri, 71, Argentine poet and writer.
Margaret Pease Harper, 80, American educator, musician and civic leader.
Ralph Marrero, 33, American actor (Day of the Dead), traffic collision.
José Miguel Olguín, 86, Chilean football player.
Gustav Wetterström, 80, Swedish football striker.

17
Eileen Agar, 91, British-Argentinian painter and photographer.
Maurice Banach, 24, German footballer, traffic collision.
Smead Jolley, 89, American baseball player.
Kafunga, 77, Brazilian football player.
Frank Kosikowski, 65, American gridiron football player.
Adrian Quist, 78, Australian tennis player.
William Strickland, 77, American conductor and organist, lung cancer.
Kelly Jean Van Dyke, 33, American actress, suicide by hanging.

18
Claude Cahen, 82, French marxist orientalist and historian.
Gustáv Husák, 78, Czechoslovak politician, president (1975–1989).
Reg Parlett, 87, English artist.
J. P. Stern, 70, Austrian-British literary scholar.
Alexey Tryoshnikov, 77, Soviet polar explorer.
Eugen York, 78, German film director.

19
Les Eyre, 69, English footballer.
Xian Henghan, 80, Chinese lieutenant general and politician.
Zi'ang Hu, 94, Chinese politician.
Michael Lyons, 81, Irish Fine Gael politician.
Reggie Nalder, 84, Austrian actor, bone cancer.
Leonid Obolensky, 89, Russian and Soviet actor.
Luis Sarria, 80, Cuban-American boxer.
Jackie Stamps, 72, English football player.

20
Yulia Drunina, 67, Soviet poet, suicide.
Siniša Glavašević, 31, Croatian reporter, homicide.
Helga Hahnemann, 54, East German German actress, comedian and singer.
Arthur Charles Hind, 86, Indian Olympic field hockey player (1932).
Kåre Kivijärvi, 53, Norwegian photographer.
Antun Stipančić, 42, Croatian table tennis player, heart attack.
 Notable Azerbaijans killed in 1991 Azerbaijani Mil Mi-8 shootdown:
Mahammad Asadov, 49, Minister of Internal Affairs, State Advisor
Ismat Gayibov, 49, Public Prosecutor General
Zulfi Hajiyev, 56, Prime Minister
Tofig Ismayilov, 58, Secretary of State.
Vagif Jafarov, 42, Member of Parliament
Osman Mirzayev, 54, Head of Presidential Administration, journalist
Ali Mustafayev, 39, Television journalist
Saylau Serikov, 50, Deputy Minister of Internal Affairs
Fakhraddin Shahbazov, 41, Camerama

21
T. S. Avinashilingam Chettiar, 88, Indian politician.
Joseph Delaney, 87, American artist.
Ernest Dichter, 84, American psychologist and marketing expert.
Prior Jones, 74, Trinidadian cricket player.
Robert Kaufman, 60, American screenwriter, film producer and television writer.
Daniel Mann, 79, American film director (Come Back, Little Sheba, BUtterfield 8, Our Man Flint), heart failure.
Bryan Stephens, 71, American baseball player.
Sonny Werblin, 81, American sports executive (New York Jets), heart attack.
John Whedon, 86, American television writer (The Donna Reed Show, The Dick Van Dyke Show, The Andy Griffith Show).
Hans Zassenhaus, 79, German mathematician.

22
Antoine Berman, 49, French translator, philosopher, and historian.
Ullrich Haupt, Jr., 76, American-German actor.
Tadashi Imai, 79, Japanese film director.
Yevgeni Ivanovski, 73, Soviet general.
John Magee, 68, American gridiron football player.

23
Klaus Kinski, 65, German actor (Aguirre, the Wrath of God, Nosferatu the Vampyre, For a Few Dollars More), heart attack.
Stanley Rimington, 99, Australian cricket player.
Ernesto Rivera, 77, Puerto Rican sports shooter and Olympian.
Ken Uehara, 82, Japanese actor.

24
Eric Carr, 41, American drummer (Kiss), heart cancer.
Anton Furst, 47, English production designer (Batman, Full Metal Jacket, Awakenings), Oscar winner (1990), suicide by jumping.
Freddie Mercury, 45, British singer (Queen) and songwriter ("Bohemian Rhapsody", "We Are the Champions"), AIDS.
Carl Sawatski, 64, American baseball player and executive.

25
Raymond Andrews, 57, American novelist, suicide.
Eleanor Audley, 86, American actress (Sleeping Beauty, Cinderella, Green Acres), respiratory failure.
Sembiin Gonchigsumlaa, 72, Mongolian composer.
Doula Mouriki, 57, Greek byzantinologist and art historian.
Jimmy Strausbaugh, 73, American gridiron football player.
Charles Wagley, 78, American anthropologist, lung cancer.

26
Dehl Berti, 70, American actor, heart attack.
François Billetdoux, 64, French novelist.
Enzo Cerusico, 54, Italian actor (La Dolce Vita), cancer.
Ed Heinemann, 83, American aeronautical engineer.
Bob Johnson, 60, American athletics coach, brain cancer.
Gertrud Pålson-Wettergren, 94, Swedish singer.

27
George Edwards, 67, American film producer and writer.
Vilém Flusser, 71, Czech-razilian philosopher, struck by vehicle.
Harry Everett Smith, 68, American polymath, cardiac arrest.
Yō Yoshimura, 37, Japanese voice actor, subarachnoid hemorrhage.

28
Mel Dinelli, 79, American writer for theatre, film and magazines.
Lu Gwei-djen, 87, Chinese historian and biochemist.
Jean Palardy, 86, French-Canadian painter, ethnologist and filmmaker.
Stan Wentzel, 74, American baseball player.
Mary Wharton, 79, American botanist, author, and environmental activist.

29
Ralph Bellamy, 87, American actor (Sunrise at Campobello, The Awful Truth, Trading Places), Tony winner (1958), lung disease.
Joe Bonson, 55, English footballer.
Theodor Estermann, 89, German-American mathematician.
Louis Finkelstein, 96, American talmud scholar.
Ludovico Geymonat, 83, Italian mathematician, philosopher and historian of science.
Nasirdin Isanov, 48, Kyrgyz politician, prime minister (since 1991), traffic collision.
Franjo Majetić, 68, Croatian actor.
Frank Yerby, 75, American writer, liver cancer.

30
Irena Blühová, 87, Slovak photographer.
Mikhail Chailakhyan, 89, Armenian-Soviet scientist.
Hans Lietzau, 78, German theatre director, actor, and producer.
David Moir Nelson, 71, American football player, coach, and author.

References 

1991-11
 11